Ella Marija Lani Yelich-O'Connor (born 7 November 1996), known professionally as Lorde, is a New Zealand singer-songwriter. Taking inspiration from aristocracy for her stage name, she is known for her unconventional musical styles and introspective songwriting.

Lorde expressed interest in performing at local venues in her early teens. She signed with Universal Music Group (UMG) in 2009 and collaborated with producer Joel Little in 2011 to start recording music. Their first effort, an extended play (EP) titled The Love Club, was self-released in 2012 for free download on SoundCloud before UMG's commercial release in 2013. The EP's international chart-topping single "Royals" helped raise Lorde to prominence. Her debut studio album Pure Heroine was released that same year to critical and commercial success. The following year, Lorde curated the soundtrack for the 2014 film The Hunger Games: Mockingjay – Part 1 and recorded several tracks, including the single "Yellow Flicker Beat".

Lorde's second studio album Melodrama (2017) received widespread critical acclaim and debuted atop the US Billboard 200. For her third studio album, Solar Power (2021), she ventured into indie folk and psychedelic styles. The album reached number one in Australia and New Zealand and charted inside the top-10 in numerous countries, although it polarised music critics and fans alike.

Lorde's accolades include two Grammy Awards, two Brit Awards, and a Golden Globe nomination. She appeared in Times list of the most influential teenagers in 2013 and 2014, and the 2014 edition of Forbes 30 Under 30. In addition to her solo work, she has co-written songs for other artists, including Broods and Bleachers. , Lorde has sold over five million albums worldwide.

Life and career

1996–2009: Early life

Ella Marija Lani Yelich-O'Connor was born on 7 November 1996 in Takapuna, New Zealand, a suburb of Auckland, to poet Sonja Yelich and civil engineer Vic O'Connor. Her mother was born to Croatian immigrants from the region of Dalmatia, while her father is of Irish descent. They announced their engagement in 2014, after a 30-year relationship, and they married in a 2017 private ceremony in Cheltenham Beach. Lorde holds dual New Zealand and Croatian citizenship.

Lorde is the second of four children: she has an older sister Jerry, a younger sister India, and a younger brother Angelo. They were raised in Auckland's North Shore suburbs of Devonport and Bayswater. At age five, she joined a drama group and developed public speaking skills. Her mother encouraged her to read a range of genres, which Lorde cited as a lyrical influence. More specifically, she cites the young adult dystopian novel Feed (2002) by M.T. Anderson as well as authors J.D. Salinger, Raymond Carver and Janet Frame for influencing her songwriting.

After a suggestion from a school instructor, her mother had her take the Woodcock–Johnson Tests of Cognitive Abilities to determine her intelligence. The results concluded that Lorde, age 6, was a gifted child. She was briefly enrolled at George Parkyn Centre, a gifted education organisation. Sonja unenrolled her, however, citing social development concerns. As a child, Lorde attended Vauxhall School and then Belmont Intermediate School in her early teens. While attending Vauxhall, she placed third and first respectively in the North Shore Primary Schools' Speech competition, a national contest, in 2006 and 2007. Lorde and her Belmont team were named the runner-up in the 2009 Kids' Lit Quiz World Finals, a global literature competition for students aged 10 to 14.

2009–2011: Career beginnings
In May 2009, Lorde and her friend Louis McDonald won the Belmont Intermediate School annual talent show as a duo. In August that year, Lorde and McDonald made a guest appearance on Jim Mora's Afternoons show on Radio New Zealand. There, they performed covers of Pixie Lott's "Mama Do (Uh Oh, Uh Oh)" and Kings of Leon's "Use Somebody". McDonald's father then sent his recordings of the duo covering "Mama Do" and Duffy's "Warwick Avenue" to Universal Music Group (UMG)'s A&R executive Scott Maclachlan. Maclachlan subsequently signed her to UMG for development.

Lorde was also part of the Belmont Intermediate School band Extreme; the band placed third in the North Shore Battle of the Bands finals at the Bruce Mason Centre, Takapuna, Auckland on 18 November 2009. In 2010, Lorde and McDonald formed a duet called "Ella & Louis" and performed covers live on a regular basis at local venues, including cafés in Auckland and the Victoria Theatre in Devonport. In 2011, UMG hired vocal coach Frances Dickinson to give her singing lessons twice a week for a year. During this time, Maclachlan attempted to partner Lorde with several different producers and songwriters, but without success. As she began writing songs, she learned how to "put words together" by reading short fiction.

Lorde performed her original songs for the first time at the Victoria Theatre in November 2011. In December, Maclachlan paired Lorde with Joel Little, a songwriter, record producer, and former Goodnight Nurse lead singer. The pair recorded five songs for an extended play (EP) at Little's Golden Age Studios in Morningside, Auckland, and finished within three weeks. While working on her music career, she attended Takapuna Grammar School from 2010 to 2013, completing Year 12. She later chose not to return in 2014 to attend Year 13.

2012–2015: Pure Heroine
When Lorde and Little had finished their first collaborative effort, The Love Club EP, Maclachlan applauded it as a "strong piece of music", but worried if the EP could profit because Lorde was obscure at the time. In November 2012, the singer self-released the EP through her SoundCloud account for free download. UMG commercially released The Love Club in March 2013 after it had been downloaded 60,000 times, which signalled that Lorde had attracted a range of audiences. It peaked at number two in New Zealand and Australia. "Royals", the EP's single, helped Lorde rise to prominence after it became a critical and commercial success, selling more than 10 million units worldwide. It peaked at number one on the Billboard Hot 100, making Lorde, then aged 16, the youngest artist to earn a number-one single in the United States since Tiffany in 1987, and has since been certified diamond by the Recording Industry Association of America (RIAA). The track won two Grammy Awards for Best Pop Solo Performance and Song of the Year at the 56th ceremony. From late 2013 to early 2016, Lorde was in a relationship with New Zealand photographer James Lowe.

Lorde's debut studio album Pure Heroine containing the single "Royals" was released in September 2013 to critical acclaim; it appeared on several year-end best album lists. The album received considerable attention for its portrayal of suburban teenage disillusionment and critiques of mainstream culture. In the United States, the album sold over one million copies in February 2014, becoming the first debut album by a female artist since Adele's 2008 album 19 to achieve the feat. Pure Heroine earned a Grammy nomination for Best Pop Vocal Album and had sold four million copies worldwide as of May 2017. Three other singles were released from the album: "Tennis Court" reached number one in New Zealand, while "Team" charted at number six in the United States, and "Glory and Gore" was released exclusively to US radio.

In November 2013, Lorde signed a publishing deal with Songs Music Publishing, worth a reported US$2.5 million, after a bidding war between companies, including Sony Music Entertainment and her label UMG. The agreement gave the publisher the right to license Lorde's music for films and advertising. Later that month, Lorde was featured on the soundtrack for the 2013 film The Hunger Games: Catching Fire, performing a cover of Tears for Fears' 1985 song "Everybody Wants to Rule the World". Time included her on their lists of the most influential teenagers in the world in 2013 and 2014. Forbes also placed her on their 2014 edition of 30 Under 30; she was the youngest individual to be featured. Billboard featured her on their 21 Under 21 list in 2013, 2014, and 2015.

In the first half of 2014, Lorde performed at several music festivals, including the Laneway Festival in Sydney, the three South American editions of Lollapalooza—Chile, Argentina, Brazil—and the Coachella Festival in California. She subsequently embarked on an international concert tour, commencing in North America in early 2014. Amidst her solo activities, Lorde joined the surviving members of Nirvana to perform "All Apologies" during the band's induction ceremony at the Rock and Roll Hall of Fame in April 2014. Band members Krist Novoselic and Dave Grohl explained that they selected Lorde because her songs represented "Nirvana aesthetics" for their perceptive lyrics. Lorde also curated the accompanying soundtrack for the 2014 film The Hunger Games: Mockingjay – Part 1, overseeing the collation of the album's content as well as recording four tracks, including its lead single "Yellow Flicker Beat". In 2015, the track earned Lorde a Golden Globe nomination for Best Original Song. Later that year, she was featured on British electronic duo Disclosure's song "Magnets" off their 2015 album Caracal.

2016–2018: Melodrama
In January 2016, Lorde relocated to Herne Bay, an affluent suburb in Auckland. At the 2016 Brit Awards in February, Lorde and David Bowie's final touring band gave a tribute performance of his 1971 song "Life on Mars". Pianist Mike Garson, a frequent band member for Bowie, explained that Bowie's family and management selected Lorde because he admired her and felt she was "the future of music". Later that year, Lorde co-wrote "Heartlines", a song by New Zealand music duo Broods from their 2016 album Conscious.

The lead single from her second studio album Melodrama, "Green Light", was released in March 2017 to critical acclaim; several publications ranked it as one of the best songs of the year, NME and The Guardian placing it in the top spot on their respective lists. It achieved moderate commercial success, reaching number one in New Zealand, number four in Australia and number nine in Canada. Later that month, she co-wrote and provided background vocals for American indie pop band Bleachers's song "Don't Take the Money", taken from their 2017 record Gone Now.

On Melodrama, Lorde's songwriting showed signs of maturity with introspective, post-breakup lyrics. The album was released in June 2017 to widespread critical acclaim; Metacritic placed it second on their list of the best-received records of 2017 based on inclusions in publications' year-end lists, behind Kendrick Lamar's Damn. It debuted at number one on the US Billboard 200, giving Lorde her first number-one album on the chart, and on record charts of Australia, Canada and New Zealand. It earned a Grammy nomination for Album of the Year at the 60th ceremony. Two other singles from the album were released: "Perfect Places" and a remix of "Homemade Dynamite" featuring Khalid, Post Malone and SZA.

To promote Melodrama, Lorde embarked on an international concert tour, the first leg of which took place in Europe in late 2017, featuring Khalid as the supporting act. She later announced the North American leg, held in March 2018, with Run the Jewels, Mitski and Tove Styrke as opening acts. A political controversy occurred in December 2017 when Lorde cancelled her scheduled June 2018 concert in Israel following an online campaign by Palestinian solidarity activists supporting the Boycott, Divestment and Sanctions (BDS) campaign. While Lorde did not explicitly indicate her reasons for the cancellation, she admitted that she had been unaware of the political turmoil there and "the right decision at this time is to cancel". Pro-Palestine groups welcomed her decision, while pro-Israel groups were critical of the cancellation. Billboard included Lorde on their 2017 edition of 21 Under 21, while Forbes included her in their 30 Under 30 Asia list.

2019–present: Going South and Solar Power

Lorde revealed on 20 May 2020 that she started working on her third studio album with Antonoff following the death of her dog Pearl. In November 2020, she announced the release of Going South, a book documenting her January 2019 visit to Antarctica with photos taken by photographer Harriet Were.

On 25 May 2021, Lorde was announced as a headlining act for Primavera Sound's June 2022 festival, her first live show performance in over two years. On 7 June, Lorde posted an image on her website with the caption "Solar Power", along with the message: "Arriving in 2021 ... Patience is a virtue." "Solar Power" was released on 10 June, as the lead single from her third studio album of the same name, which was released on 20 August to mixed reviews. "Stoned at the Nail Salon"  and "Mood Ring"  were released as the album's second and third singles on 21 July and 17 August, respectively.

Lorde released  on 9 September 2021 as a companion piece to Solar Power. Other translators included Sir Tīmoti Kāretu and Hēmi Kelly. The project was led by Dame Hinewehi Mohi.

Artistry

Influences
Lorde grew up listening to American jazz and soul musicians Billie Holiday, Sam Cooke, Etta James, and Otis Redding, whose music she admires for "harvesting their suffering." She also listened to her parents' favourite records by the likes of Cat Stevens, Neil Young, and Fleetwood Mac in her early years. During production of Pure Heroine, Lorde cited influences from electronic music producers, including SBTRKT, Grimes, and Sleigh Bells, impressed by "their vocals in a really interesting way, whether it might be chopping up a vocal part or really lash or layering a vocal." Lorde also stated that she was inspired by the initially hidden identities of Burial and the Weeknd, explaining, "I feel like mystery is more interesting." Other inspirations include Grace Jones, James Blake, Yeasayer, Animal Collective, Bon Iver, the Smiths, Arcade Fire, Laurie Anderson, Kanye West, Prince, and David Bowie.

Lyrically, Lorde cited her mother, a poet, as the primary influence for her songwriting. She also named several authors, including Kurt Vonnegut, Raymond Carver, Wells Tower, Tobias Wolff, Claire Vaye Watkins, Sylvia Plath, Walt Whitman, and T. S. Eliot as lyrical inspirations, particularly noting their sentence structures. When writing her second album, Melodrama, Lorde took inspiration from the melodic styles of a variety of musicians, including Phil Collins, Don Henley, Rihanna, Florence + the Machine, Tom Petty, Joni Mitchell, Leonard Cohen, and Robyn. During the recording process, Lorde stated that Frank Ocean's 2016 album Blonde inspired her to eschew "traditional song structures." She frequently listened to Paul Simon's 1986 album Graceland while riding subways in New York City and on taxi rides on the way home from parties in her hometown of Auckland. She cited the 1950 science fiction short story "There Will Come Soft Rains" by Ray Bradbury as inspiration for much of Melodramas story, relating it to her own realities she faced.

Musical style and songwriting

Lorde is noted for her unconventional pop sound and introspective songwriting. In a 2017 interview with NME, she declared "I don't think about staying in my genre lane". AllMusic's Stephen Thomas Erlewine characterised her style as primarily electropop, while scholar Tony Mitchell categorized her as an alt-pop singer. Upon the release of Pure Heroine, contemporary critics described her music as electropop, art pop, dream pop, indie pop, and indie-electro, with influences of hip hop. Melodrama was a departure from the hip hop-oriented minimalist style of its predecessor, incorporating piano instrumentation and maximalist electronic beats.

Before Melodrama, Lorde only sang and did not play musical instruments on her records or onstage, saying, "[My] voice needs to have the focus. My vocal-scape is really important". PopMatters described Lorde's vocals as "unique and powerfully intriguing", while Billboard characterised her voice as "dynamic, smoky and restrained". For the Melodrama World Tour, however, she played a drum pad sampler, and xylophone onstage in some performances. Shortly after finishing her tour, Lorde said she had started learning to play the piano. Vice noted that her songs incorporated the mixolydian mode, a melodic structure used in "blues-based and alternative rock" music, which set her songs apart from those in pop music for not fitting a common major or minor chord.

Regarding her songwriting process, Lorde explained that the foundation to her songs began with the lyrics, which could sometimes stem from a singular word meant to summarise a specific idea she had tried to identify. For "Tennis Court", Lorde wrote the music before lyrics. She stated that the songwriting on Pure Heroine developed from the perspective of an observer. Similarly, in an interview with NME, Lorde acknowledged that she used words of inclusion throughout her debut album, while her follow-up Melodrama presented a shift to first-person narrative, employing more introspective lyrics inspired by Lorde's personal struggles post-breakup and viewpoints on post-teenage maturity. Lorde's neurological condition chromesthesia influenced her songwriting on the album; it led her to arrange colours according to each song's theme and emotion.

Public image and impact

Lorde's stage name illustrates her fascination with "royals and aristocracy"; she added an "e" after the name Lord, which she felt was too masculine, to make it more feminine. She described her public image as something that "naturally" came to her and was identical to her real-life personality. Lorde identifies as a feminist. The New Zealand Herald opined that her feminist ideology was different from her contemporaries due to Lorde's disinterest in sexualised performances. She proclaimed herself in an interview with V magazine as a "hugely sex-positive person", saying, "I have nothing against anyone getting naked. ... I just don't think it really would complement my music in any way or help me tell a story any better".

Critical reception of Lorde is generally positive, with praise concentrated on her maturity both musically and lyrically. The New York Times called her "the pop prodigy" who was not conformed to boundaries and always sought experimentation. Billboard recognised Lorde as a spokesperson for a "female rock resurgence" by introducing her works to rock and alternative radio, which had seen a traditional male dominance. The publication also named her the "New Queen of Alternative" in a 2013 cover story. Journalist Robert Christgau was less enthusiastic towards Lorde's styles, labelling the singer as "a pop property" that was indistinguishable from other mainstream artists.

Lorde's critiques of mainstream culture on Pure Heroine earned her the title "the voice of her generation", a label she dismissed, saying that "young people have never needed a specialised spokesperson". Jon Caramanica, writing for The New York Times, credited Lorde for bringing forth a "wave of female rebellion" to mainstream audiences that embraced an "anti-pop" sentiment. Sharing a similar viewpoint, Rolling Stone and NPR credited her debut studio album Pure Heroine as the foundation of that transformation. Several analysts also noted Lorde's influence on the music trends of the 2010s, and have credited the singer with paving the way for the current generation of alternative-leaning pop artists. She placed at number 12 on NPR's 2018 readers poll of the most influential female musicians of the 21st century. Her work has influenced several contemporary artists, including Billie Eilish, Olivia Rodrigo, Sabrina Carpenter, Conan Gray, and Troye Sivan.

Her onstage persona, particularly her signature unchoreographed dancing, has polarised audiences. Her detractors have described her dance moves as "awkward" in comparison to contemporary stage performers. The Fader expressed that she should be celebrated for her dancing as it is "more freeform and spontaneous" than structured choreography and "speaks an entirely different expressive language". The publication further elaborated that her "stage presence [is] more impactful than the average pop performance". Lorde was parodied in the South Park episodes "The Cissy" and "Rehash", broadcast in October and December 2014, respectively.

Philanthropy
Lorde has been involved in several philanthropic causes. "The Love Club" was included in the 2013 charity album Songs for the Philippines to support the people in the Philippines who suffered from Typhoon Haiyan. In 2015, Lorde recorded "Team Ball Player Thing", a charity single, as part of the supergroup Kiwis Cure Batten. All sales from the song went towards research for the cure of Batten disease, a fatal neurodegenerative disorder. Later that year, the singer was featured in the compilation album The Art of Peace: Songs for Tibet II to raise funds for the preservation of the Tibetan culture. The following year, Lorde made a NZ$20,000 donation to Fuel the Need, a New Zealand charity that provides lunches for underprivileged schoolchildren. In 2018, she donated NZ$5,000 to Starship Hospital to fund the purchase of "five new portable neurology monitors." Lorde became a patron of MusicHelps, formerly the New Zealand Music Foundation, a musical charity helping New Zealanders who are vulnerable to or experiencing serious health issues, in November 2018.

Accolades and achievements

After her breakthrough, Lorde won four New Zealand Music Awards at the 2013 ceremony. The single "Royals" earned the APRA Silver Scroll Award, and two Grammy Awards for Best Pop Solo Performance and Song of the Year. In 2015, she received a Golden Globe nomination for Best Original Song as a songwriter for "Yellow Flicker Beat". Her second studio album Melodrama received a Grammy nomination for Album of the Year at the 60th ceremony. Lorde has received two Brit Awards for International Female Solo Artist. The singer has also won two Billboard Music Awards, one MTV Video Music Award and three World Music Awards. She had sold over five million albums worldwide as of June 2017 and 15 million certified single units in the United States.

Discography

 Pure Heroine (2013)
 Melodrama (2017)
 Solar Power (2021)

Bibliography
 Going South (2021)

Filmography

Tours
 Pure Heroine Tour (2013–2014)
 Melodrama World Tour (2017–2018)
 Solar Power Tour (2022–2023)

References

Notes

External links

 
 
 
 

 
1996 births
Living people
New Zealand women singer-songwriters
New Zealand women pop singers
New Zealand women in electronic music
21st-century New Zealand women singers
Māori-language singers
Art pop musicians
Dream pop musicians
Electropop musicians
Child pop musicians
Musicians from Auckland
Grammy Award winners
APRA Award winners
Brit Award winners
Shorty Award winners
Universal Music Group artists
Feminist musicians
New Zealand feminists
Sex-positive feminists
Album-cover and concert-poster artists
People educated at Takapuna Grammar School
Citizens of Croatia through descent
New Zealand people of Croatian descent
New Zealand people of Irish descent
People from Takapuna